Tan Shumei (born 24 August 1989) is a Chinese wheelchair fencer. She won gold medals in both the women's Sabre B and Épée B events at the 2020 Summer Paralympics held in Tokyo, Japan. She also won the gold medal in the Team Épée.  She also won four World Championship medals.

References 

Living people
1989 births
Place of birth missing (living people)
Chinese female fencers
Chinese épée fencers
Chinese sabre fencers
Wheelchair fencers at the 2020 Summer Paralympics
Medalists at the 2020 Summer Paralympics
Paralympic gold medalists for China
Paralympic medalists in wheelchair fencing
Paralympic wheelchair fencers of China
21st-century Chinese women